Lightstorm Entertainment  is an American independent production company founded in 1990 by filmmaker James Cameron and producer Lawrence Kasanoff. The majority of its films have been distributed and owned by 20th Century Fox, now known as 20th Century Studios. It has produced several films including Terminator 2: Judgment Day, True Lies, Titanic, Alita: Battle Angel and the Avatar film series; Cameron has employed other filmmakers to produce and direct films under the Lightstorm banner.

In 1995, the company established a first look deal with 20th Century Fox.

The company's logo depicts a bowman using a lightning bolt as an arrow.

Films

Upcoming

Television

References

External links 
 

Film production companies of the United States
Entertainment companies based in California
James Cameron
American companies established in 1990
Entertainment companies established in 1990
1990 establishments in California
Companies based in Santa Monica, California